Furcilarnaca  is an Asian genus of Orthopterans, sometimes known as 'leaf-folding crickets', in the subfamily Gryllacridinae and tribe Gryllacridini (genus group Metriogryllacrae).  Species have been recorded from China and Indochina.

Species 
The Orthoptera Species File lists:
 Furcilarnaca affinis Li, Sun, Liu & Li, 2015
 Furcilarnaca armata (Bey-Bienko, 1962)
 Furcilarnaca belokobylskyi Gorochov, 2004
 Furcilarnaca beybienkoi Gorochov, 2004
 Furcilarnaca brachyptera Li, Sun, Liu & Li, 2015
 Furcilarnaca chiangdao Ingrisch, 2018
 Furcilarnaca chirurga (Bey-Bienko, 1962)
 Furcilarnaca fallax (Liu, Bi & Zhang, 2010)
 Furcilarnaca forceps (Bey-Bienko, 1962)
 Furcilarnaca fractiflexa Li, Sun, Liu & Li, 2015
 Furcilarnaca hirta Li, Sun, Liu & Li, 2015
 Furcilarnaca huangi Gorochov, 2004
 Furcilarnaca pulex (Karny, 1928)
 Furcilarnaca salit Ingrisch, 2018
 Furcilarnaca superfurca Gorochov, 2004 - type species - locality Sơn La Province, Vietnam
 Furcilarnaca trilobata Ingrisch, 2018
 Furcilarnaca wufengensis Bian, Shi & Guo, 2013

References

External links

Ensifera genera
Gryllacrididae
Orthoptera of Indo-China